Mark Clark may refer to:

Mark A. Clark (politician) (born 1967), Arizona state legislator
Mark A. Clark (general), U.S. Marine Corps general in charge of their Special Operations Command
Mark W. Clark (1896–1984), U.S. Army general during World War II and Korean War
Mark Clark (baseball) (born 1968), Major League Baseball player
Mark Clark (activist) (1947–1969), killed with Fred Hampton in an infamous Chicago police raid in 1969

See also
Mark Clarke (born 1950), English musician
Mark Clarke (politician) (born 1977), English politician